You Shouldn't-Nuf Bit Fish is the second studio album by American funk musician George Clinton released in 1983 by Capitol Records. The album reached No. 18 on the Billboard Top Soul Albums chart.

Overview
You Shouldn't-Nuf Bit Fish was produced by George Clinton. You Shouldn't-Nuf Bit Fish expands on the R&B and dance style of Clinton's debut album, Computer Games (1982), and it incorporates elements of rock with a more mainstream sound. The P-Funk live concert tour of 1984 concentrated on the tracks featured on the album.

Singles
"Nubian Nut" reached No. 15 on the Billboard Hot Soul Songs chart. "Last Dance" also peaked at No. 26 on the Billboard Hot Soul Songs chart.

Track listing

Personnel
Produced by George Clinton
"Quickie" co-produced by Junie Morrison
"Last Dance" and "You Shouldn't-Nuf Bit Fish" co-produced by Garry Shider

Junie Morrison, Bootsy Collins, Andre Williams, DeWayne McKnight, Eddie Hazel - guitar
Michael Hampton - guitar, avatar
Bootsy Collins, Lige Curry, Michael Payne - bass
Larry Fratangelo, Muruga Booker - percussion
Maceo Parker - saxophone
Richard Griffith, Larry Hatcher - trumpet
Bootsy Collins - drums
Junie Morrison, Doug Duffy, David Spradley, DeWayne McKnight, Michael Payne, Ron Cron - synthesizer
Junie Morrison, Doug Duffy - piano
Junie Morrison, Doug Duffy, David Spradley, Bernie Worrell, Ron Cron - keyboards
Fred Wesley - trombone
George Clinton, Garry Shider, Gary Cooper, Ron Ford, Eddie Hazel, Darryl Clinton, Shirley Hayden, Kim Seay, Lane Strickland, Tracey Lewis, Robert Johnson, Blackbird McKnight, Michael Payne, Andre Williams, Jimmy Giles, Mallia Franklin, James Gilmore, Rev. Uriah - backing vocals

Charts

Weekly charts

Year-end charts

References

Notes
 
 

1983 albums
George Clinton (funk musician) albums
Capitol Records albums
Albums with cover art by Pedro Bell